The Jičín Uplands are uplands and a geomorphological mesoregion of the Czech Republic. It is located in the Hradec Králové, Liberec and Central Bohemian regions.

Geomorphology
The Jičín Uplands are a mesoregion of the North Bohemian Table within the Bohemian Massif. The uplands are rugged and sometimes have a character of flat highlands. Typical features of the relief are cuestas, tabular plateaus, horst and anticlinal ridges, erosional denudation and tectonically conditioned basins, and furrows. The relief is complemented by several river terraces. The uplands are further subdivided into the microregions of Turnov Uplands and Bělohrad Uplands.

There are a lot of medium-high hills. The relief is very rugged, but the elevations are low. The highest peaks are located in the northern part of the territory. The highest peaks of the Jičín Uplands are:
Sokol, 
Zabolky, 
Dehtovská horka, 
Trosky, 
Hrobka, 
Vyskeř, 
Přivýšina, 
Mužský, 
Záleský vrch, 
Střelečská hůra,

Geography
The territory is L-shaped and elongated from west to east.

The west of the territory is drained by the Jizera River, the east is drained by the Elbe. A notable river that crosses the centre of the territory is also the Cidlina (a tributaty of the Elbe).

Suitable natural conditions contributed to the creation of many settlements in the Jičín Uplands. The most populated settlements located in whole or in large part in the territory are Mladá Boleslav, Jičín, Dvůr Králové nad Labem, Turnov, Mnichovo Hradiště, Hořice, Bakov nad Jizerou and Kosmonosy.

Nature
The territory alternates between forested and agricultural landscapes. The centre and north of the Jičín Uplands are continuously forested and are protected as the Bohemian Paradise Protected Landscape Area. Almost its entire area of  lies in the Jičín Uplands.

Gallery

References

Mountain ranges of the Czech Republic
Geography of the Hradec Králové Region
Geography of the Liberec Region
Geography of the Central Bohemian Region